These are the results for the men's individual trampoline competition, one of two events of the trampoline discipline contested in the gymnastics at the 2004 Summer Olympics. The qualification and final rounds took place on August 21 in the Olympic Indoor Hall in Athens.

Results

Qualification
Sixteen gymnasts competed in the qualification round by performing a compulsory routine followed by a free routine. For the compulsory routine (#1), each gymnast received a score from 0.0 to 10.0 from each of the five execution judges, with the highest and lowest scores being dropped. The free routine (#2) had a similar format but included a difficulty score, determined by two difficulty judges, which was added to the three kept scores from the execution judges. The scores from the two routines were summed to give the total score and the eight highest scoring gymnasts advanced to the final.

Final
The eight qualified gymnasts performed a single free routine with the same scoring format as in the qualification round.

References

 Gymnastics Results.com

Men's trampoline
2004 Men's
Men's events at the 2004 Summer Olympics